Thomas Shoal may refer to:

Dangerous Ground, Spratly Islands, South China Sea
First Thomas Shoal 
Second Thomas Shoal
Third Thomas Shoal   

United States
Thomas Point Shoal, Chesapeake Bay, Maryland